Eyob Zambataro (born 18 August 1998) is an Italian footballer of Ethiopian origin. He plays as a defender for  club Lecco.

Club career
Zambataro made his Serie C debut for Padova on 25 November 2017 in a game against AlbinoLeffe.

On 22 December 2019, he joined Serie C club Ravenna on loan until the end of the 2019–20 season.

On 25 August 2020 he moved to Monopoli.

On 10 August 2021 he was loaned to Serie C club Lecco. On 27 July 2022, Zambataro returned to Lecco on a permanent basis with a two-year contract.

References

External links
 

1998 births
Living people
Sportspeople from Addis Ababa
Ethiopian emigrants to Italy
Italian sportspeople of African descent
Italian footballers
Ethiopian footballers
Association football defenders
Serie C players
Atalanta B.C. players
Calcio Padova players
Ravenna F.C. players
S.S. Monopoli 1966 players
Calcio Lecco 1912 players